Rocco Quinn (born 7 September 1986 in Hamilton) is a Scottish retired professional football who played  as a midfielder. Quinn has previously played for Celtic, Hamilton Academical, Queen of the South, Ross County and St Mirren, as well as Kilmarnock, St Johnstone and Livingston on loan.

Career

Quinn began his career with Celtic, but didn't make a competitive first team appearance for the club with all of his first-team experience at this stage coming in three loan spells at other clubs. He spent the second half of the 2006–07 season on loan to Kilmarnock,.

On 1 September 2007, he joined St Johnstone on loan in an attempt to get some first-team experience. He scored his first-ever league goal in St Johnstone's 2–1 victory over Partick Thistle at McDiarmid Park on 15 September 2007. During this loan spell, he played as St Johnstone won the Challenge Cup, beating Dunfermline Athletic 3–2 in the final. Quinn returned to St Johnstone in February 2008 on an emergency loan for the remainder of the 2007–08 season.

In the 2008–09 season, Quinn joined Livingston on loan in August 2008. He left Celtic permanently in January 2009, signing for Hamilton Academical on the last day of the transfer window, but he was released by the club at the end of the season.

Quinn signed for Dumfries side Queen of the South on 29 May 2009. He promptly established himself as a first team regular scoring a competitive debut goal in the Scottish League Cup 4–1 win away at Queens Park on 1 August 2009. His league debut was the 1–1 home draw a week later against Raith Rovers. He scored league goals that season in games against Ayr United, Partick Thistle and a double against Greenock Morton. The Palmerston Park side ended the season in fifth place. He also played on 23 September 2009 in the 2–1 home League Cup defeat against Rangers. In total Quinn made 35 competitive first team appearances in his first season.

The QoS website confirmed on 18 June 2011 that Quinn had left and signed for Ross County. In his first season at County, they won the First Division and were promoted to the Scottish Premier League for the first time. After helping the club to a fifth-place finish in 2012–13, Quinn signed a new contract.

After five-years with the Dingwall side, Quinn moved to Scottish Championship side St Mirren in January 2016. Quinn agreed a new two-year deal with Saints on 30 April 2016, tying him to the club until the end of season 2017–18. However, Quinn was released by the club in August 2017 after just one year into his new deal.

Honours
St Johnstone
Scottish Challenge Cup: 2007–08

References

External links

1986 births
Scottish footballers
Living people
Celtic F.C. players
Kilmarnock F.C. players
St Johnstone F.C. players
Livingston F.C. players
Hamilton Academical F.C. players
Queen of the South F.C. players
Ross County F.C. players
St Mirren F.C. players
Scottish Premier League players
Scottish Football League players
Scotland under-21 international footballers
Association football midfielders
Footballers from Hamilton, South Lanarkshire
Scottish Professional Football League players